Robert Hamilton Dudley (born November 18, 1933) was a justice of the Arkansas Supreme Court from 1981 to 1996.

Born in Jonesboro, Arkansas, attended Arkansas State College for a year, and worked in the United States Senate stationery office while attending George Washington University for a time. He received a his law degree from the University of Arkansas at Fayetteville in 1958. Dudley engaged in the private practice of law until 1964, when he was elected as a prosecuting attorney. He was elected to a chancery court seat in 1970, and then to the state supreme court in 1980. Dudley retired from the court in 1996.

Personal life
Dudley married twice, first to Sally Wentzel of New York, with whom he had four children before their divorce in 1985, and then to Mary Lynn Schwarz, in 1991.

References

1933 births
People from Jonesboro, Arkansas
George Washington University alumni
University of Arkansas alumni
University of Arkansas School of Law alumni
American prosecutors
Justices of the Arkansas Supreme Court
Living people